The 1993–94 NBA season was the Hawks' 45th season in the National Basketball Association, and 26th season in Atlanta. In the off-season, Chicago Bulls All-Star guard Michael Jordan shocked the NBA by announcing his retirement. This meant that various teams in the league had an opportunity to contend for a championship. The Hawks hired Hall of Famer Lenny Wilkens as their new head coach. Wilkens was a star guard for the franchise when it was based in St. Louis in the 1960s. He was quickly moving up the all-time coaching wins list after successful runs with the Seattle SuperSonics and Cleveland Cavaliers. Wilkens employed a defensive system which benefited several members of the team. The team also signed free agents Craig Ehlo, and Andrew Lang during the off-season.

The Hawks got off to a slow start losing four of their first five games, but then went on a 14-game winning streak between November and December, which led to a 15–4 start, as they held a 34–13 record at the All-Star break. Despite being in first place in the East, the Hawks would trade All-Star forward Dominique Wilkins to the Los Angeles Clippers in exchange for All-Star forward Danny Manning on February 24. By the end of the season, the Hawks finished first overall in the Eastern Conference with a record of 57 wins and 25 losses.

Kevin Willis led the team with 19.1 points and 12.0 rebounds per game, while Mookie Blaylock averaged 13.8 points, 9.7 assists and 2.6 steals per game, and was named to the NBA All-Defensive First Team. In addition, Stacey Augmon provided the team with 14.8 points and 1.8 steals per game, while Ehlo contributed 10.0 points and 1.7 steals per game off the bench as the team's sixth man, and Jon Koncak led the team with 1.5 blocks per game. Wilkins and Blaylock were both selected for the 1994 NBA All-Star Game, with Lenny Wilkens coaching the Eastern Conference. Wilkens was also named Coach of the Year, and Ehlo finished in third place in Sixth Man of the Year voting.

In the playoffs, the Hawks trailed 2–1 to the 8th-seeded Miami Heat in the Eastern Conference First Round, but won the series in five games. However, they lost to the 5th-seeded Indiana Pacers four games to two in the Eastern Conference Semi-finals. Following the season, Manning signed as a free agent with the Phoenix Suns, while Duane Ferrell signed with the Indiana Pacers, and second-year forward Adam Keefe was traded to the Utah Jazz.

Offseason

Draft picks

Roster

Roster Notes
 Power forward Roy Hinson missed the entire season due to a knee injury, and never played for the Hawks.
 Center Blair Rasmussen missed the entire season due to a back injury.

Regular season

Season standings

Record vs. opponents

Game log

Regular season

|- align="center" bgcolor="#ccffcc"
| 1
| November 5, 1993
| Indiana
| W 116–110
|
|
|
| The Omni
| 1–0
|- align="center" bgcolor="#ffcccc"
| 2
| November 8, 1993
| @ Chicago
| L 80–106
|
|
|
| Chicago Stadium
| 1–1
|- align="center" bgcolor="#ffcccc"
| 3
| November 10, 1993
| @ Utah
| L 88–91
|
|
|
| Delta Center
| 1–2
|- align="center" bgcolor="#ffcccc"
| 4
| November 12, 1993
| @ Portland
| L 84–94
|
|
|
| Memorial Coliseum
| 1–3
|- align="center" bgcolor="#ffcccc"
| 5
| November 13, 1993
| @ Seattle
| L 89–97 (OT)
|
|
|
| Seattle Center Coliseum
| 1–4
|- align="center" bgcolor="#ccffcc"
| 6
| November 16, 1993
| Sacramento
| W 118–95
|
|
|
| The Omni
| 2–4
|- align="center" bgcolor="#ccffcc"
| 7
| November 17, 1993
| @ Philadelphia
| W 92–90
|
|
|
| The Spectrum
| 3–4
|- align="center" bgcolor="#ccffcc"
| 8
| November 19, 1993
| @ Miami
| W 95–92
|
|
|
| Miami Arena
| 4–4
|- align="center" bgcolor="#ccffcc"
| 9
| November 20, 1993
| Charlotte
| W 96–91
|
|
|
| The Omni
| 5–4
|- align="center" bgcolor="#ccffcc"
| 10
| November 23, 1993
| L.A. Lakers
| W 103–93
|
|
|
| The Omni
| 6–4
|- align="center" bgcolor="#ccffcc"
| 11
| November 24, 1993
| @ Milwaukee
| W 89–85
|
|
|
| Bradley Center
| 7–4
|- align="center" bgcolor="#ccffcc"
| 12
| November 26, 1993
| Washington
| W 124–108
|
|
|
| The Omni
| 8–4
|- align="center" bgcolor="#ccffcc"
| 13
| November 27, 1993
| Philadelphia
| W 111–79
|
|
|
| The Omni
| 9–4
|- align="center" bgcolor="#ccffcc"
| 14
| November 30, 1993
| Boston
| W 122–114
|
|
|
| The Omni
| 10–4

|- align="center" bgcolor="#ccffcc"
| 15
| December 3, 1993
| Houston
| W 133–111
|
|
|
| The Omni
| 11–4
|- align="center" bgcolor="#ccffcc"
| 16
| December 8, 1993
| @ Detroit
| W 105–97
|
|
|
| The Palace of Auburn Hills
| 12–4
|- align="center" bgcolor="#ccffcc"
| 17
| December 9, 1993
| San Antonio
| W 105–95
|
|
|
| The Omni
| 13–4
|- align="center" bgcolor="#ccffcc"
| 18
| December 11, 1993
| @ Washington(at Baltimore, MD)
| W 116–108
|
|
|
| Baltimore Arena
| 14–4
|- align="center" bgcolor="#ccffcc"
| 19
| December 14, 1993
| @ Cleveland
| W 103–92
|
|
|
| Richfield Coliseum
| 15–4
|- align="center" bgcolor="#ffcccc"
| 20
| December 16, 1993
| Indiana
| L 81–99
|
|
|
| The Omni
| 15–5
|- align="center" bgcolor="#ccffcc"
| 21
| December 18, 1993
| Denver
| W 102–96
|
|
|
| The Omni
| 16–5
|- align="center" bgcolor="#ccffcc"
| 22
| December 22, 1993
| @ Boston
| W 108–103
|
|
|
| Boston Garden
| 17–5
|- align="center" bgcolor="#ffcccc"
| 23
| December 23, 1993
| @ New York
| L 75–84
|
|
|
| Madison Square Garden
| 17–6
|- align="center" bgcolor="#ffcccc"
| 24
| December 26, 1993
| @ New Jersey
| L 87–91
|
|
|
| Brendan Byrne Arena
| 17–7
|- align="center" bgcolor="#ccffcc"
| 25
| December 28, 1993
| Detroit
| W 119–101
|
|
|
| The Omni
| 18–7
|- align="center" bgcolor="#ccffcc"
| 26
| December 29, 1993
| @ Orlando
| W 92–90
|
|
|
| Orlando Arena
| 19–7

|- align="center" bgcolor="#ccffcc"
| 27
| January 4, 1994
| Charlotte
| W 133–94
|
|
|
| The Omni
| 20–7
|- align="center" bgcolor="#ccffcc"
| 28
| January 7, 1994
| Portland
| W 100–85
|
|
|
| The Omni
| 21–7
|- align="center" bgcolor="#ccffcc"
| 29
| January 8, 1994
| Cleveland
| W 102–89
|
|
|
| The Omni
| 22–7
|- align="center" bgcolor="#ccffcc"
| 30
| January 12, 1994
| Chicago
| W 92–81
|
|
|
| The Omni
| 23–7
|- align="center" bgcolor="#ccffcc"
| 31
| January 14, 1994
| Dallas
| W 113–96
|
|
|
| The Omni
| 24–7
|- align="center" bgcolor="#ffcccc"
| 32
| January 15, 1994
| @ Indiana
| L 91–94
|
|
|
| Market Square Arena
| 24–8
|- align="center" bgcolor="#ccffcc"
| 33
| January 17, 1994
| Milwaukee
| W 102–98
|
|
|
| The Omni
| 25–8
|- align="center" bgcolor="#ffcccc"
| 34
| January 19, 1994
| Golden State
| L 119–120
|
|
|
| The Omni
| 25–9
|- align="center" bgcolor="#ffcccc"
| 35
| January 21, 1994
| New Jersey
| L 111–113 (OT)
|
|
|
| The Omni
| 25–10
|- align="center" bgcolor="#ccffcc"
| 36
| January 22, 1994
| @ Minnesota
| W 98–81
|
|
|
| Target Center
| 26–10
|- align="center" bgcolor="#ccffcc"
| 37
| January 25, 1994
| @ Milwaukee
| W 95–90
|
|
|
| Bradley Center
| 27–10
|- align="center" bgcolor="#ccffcc"
| 38
| January 26, 1994
| Phoenix
| W 116–107
|
|
|
| The Omni
| 28–10
|- align="center" bgcolor="#ccffcc"
| 39
| January 28, 1994
| @ Charlotte
| W 117–105
|
|
|
| Charlotte Coliseum
| 29–10
|- align="center" bgcolor="#ffcccc"
| 40
| January 29, 1994
| @ San Antonio
| L 87–100
|
|
|
| Alamodome
| 29–11
|- align="center" bgcolor="#ccffcc"
| 41
| January 31, 1994
| @ Dallas
| W 90–85
|
|
|
| Reunion Arena
| 30–11

|- align="center" bgcolor="#ccffcc"
| 42
| February 2, 1994
| Orlando
| W 118–99
|
|
|
| The Omni
| 31–11
|- align="center" bgcolor="#ccffcc"
| 43
| February 4, 1994
| New York
| W 114–102
|
|
|
| The Omni
| 32–11
|- align="center" bgcolor="#ffcccc"
| 44
| February 5, 1994
| @ Cleveland
| L 93–109
|
|
|
| Richfield Coliseum
| 32–12
|- align="center" bgcolor="#ccffcc"
| 45
| February 7, 1994
| Detroit
| W 141–97
|
|
|
| The Omni
| 32–13
|- align="center" bgcolor="#ffcccc"
| 46
| February 9, 1994
| @ Orlando
| L 87–104
|
|
|
| Orlando Arena
| 33–13
|- align="center" bgcolor="#ccffcc"
| 47
| February 10, 1994
| Miami
| W 114–98
|
|
|
| The Omni
| 34–13
|- align="center"
|colspan="9" bgcolor="#bbcaff"|All-Star Break
|- style="background:#cfc;"
|- bgcolor="#bbffbb"
|- align="center" bgcolor="#ffcccc"
| 48
| February 15, 1994
| @ Houston
| L 99–103
|
|
|
| The Summit
| 34–14
|- align="center" bgcolor="#ffcccc"
| 49
| February 17, 1994
| @ Golden State
| L 115–119
|
|
|
| Oakland-Alameda County Coliseum Arena
| 34–15
|- align="center" bgcolor="#ccffcc"
| 50
| February 18, 1994
| @ L.A. Clippers
| W 97–91
|
|
|
| Los Angeles Memorial Sports Arena
| 35–15
|- align="center" bgcolor="#ffcccc"
| 51
| February 20, 1994
| @ Denver
| L 92–97
|
|
|
| McNichols Sports Arena
| 35–16
|- align="center" bgcolor="#ccffcc"
| 52
| February 23, 1994
| Seattle
| W 99–92
|
|
|
| The Omni
| 36–16
|- align="center" bgcolor="#ccffcc"
| 53
| February 25, 1994
| Milwaukee
| W 111–100
|
|
|
| The Omni
| 37–16
|- align="center" bgcolor="#ccffcc"
| 54
| February 26, 1994
| @ Philadelphia
| W 118–102
|
|
|
| The Spectrum
| 38–16

|- align="center" bgcolor="#ccffcc"
| 55
| March 1, 1994
| Minnesota
| W 102–99
|
|
|
| The Omni
| 39–16
|- align="center" bgcolor="#ccffcc"
| 56
| March 3, 1994
| @ Washington
| W 109–98
|
|
|
| USAir Arena
| 40–16
|- align="center" bgcolor="#ccffcc"
| 57
| March 5, 1994
| Indiana
| W 90–88
|
|
|
| The Omni
| 41–16
|- align="center" bgcolor="#ffcccc"
| 58
| March 8, 1994
| @ Chicago
| L 95–116
|
|
|
| Chicago Stadium
| 41–17
|- align="center" bgcolor="#ffcccc"
| 59
| March 9, 1994
| New York
| L 83–90
|
|
|
| The Omni
| 41–18
|- align="center" bgcolor="#ccffcc"
| 60
| March 11, 1994
| Chicago
| W 108–77
|
|
|
| The Omni
| 42–18
|- align="center" bgcolor="#ccffcc"
| 61
| March 12, 1994
| @ Detroit
| W 104–92
|
|
|
| The Palace of Auburn Hills
| 43–18
|- align="center" bgcolor="#ffcccc"
| 62
| March 16, 1994
| @ Charlotte
| L 79–92
|
|
|
| Charlotte Coliseum
| 43–19
|- align="center" bgcolor="#ccffcc"
| 63
| March 18, 1994
| @ Indiana
| W 81–78
|
|
|
| Market Square Arena
| 44–19
|- align="center" bgcolor="#ccffcc"
| 64
| March 20, 1994
| @ Boston
| W 101–80
|
|
|
| Boston Garden
| 45–19
|- align="center" bgcolor="#ccffcc"
| 65
| March 21, 1994
| Utah
| W 100–96 (OT)
|
|
|
| The Omni
| 46–19
|- align="center" bgcolor="#ccffcc"
| 66
| March 23, 1994
| Charlotte
| W 100–92
|
|
|
| The Omni
| 47–19
|- align="center" bgcolor="#ffcccc"
| 67
| March 25, 1994
| L.A. Clippers
| L 94–97
|
|
|
| The Omni
| 47–20
|- align="center" bgcolor="#ccffcc"
| 68
| March 26, 1994
| Miami
| W 100–90
|
|
|
| The Omni
| 48–20
|- align="center" bgcolor="#ccffcc"
| 69
| March 29, 1994
| New Jersey
| W 101–98
|
|
|
| The Omni
| 49–20
|- align="center" bgcolor="#ccffcc"
| 70
| March 31, 1994
| @ Sacramento
| W 106–102
|
|
|
| ARCO Arena
| 50–20

|- align="center" bgcolor="#ffcccc"
| 71
| April 1, 1994
| @ Phoenix
| L 87–93
|
|
|
| America West Arena
| 50–21
|- align="center" bgcolor="#ffcccc"
| 72
| April 3, 1994
| @ L.A. Lakers
| L 89–102
|
|
|
| Great Western Forum
| 50–22
|- align="center" bgcolor="#ccffcc"
| 73
| April 6, 1994
| Boston
| W 111–107
|
|
|
| The Omni
| 51–22
|- align="center" bgcolor="#ffcccc"
| 74
| April 7, 1994
| @ New Jersey
| L 87–93
|
|
|
| Brendan Byrne Arena
| 51–23
|- align="center" bgcolor="#ccffcc"
| 75
| April 9, 1994
| Washington
| W 117–103
|
|
|
| The Omni
| 52–23
|- align="center" bgcolor="#ccffcc"
| 76
| April 13, 1994
| Cleveland
| W 110–95
|
|
|
| The Omni
| 53–23
|- align="center" bgcolor="#ccffcc"
| 77
| April 15, 1994
| @ Milwaukee
| W 105–96
|
|
|
| Bradley Center
| 54–23
|- align="center" bgcolor="#ccffcc"
| 78
| April 16, 1994
| Philadelphia
| W 123–94
|
|
|
| The Omni
| 55–23
|- align="center" bgcolor="#ffcccc"
| 79
| April 18, 1994
| @ Chicago
| L 70–87
|
|
|
| Chicago Stadium
| 55–24
|- align="center" bgcolor="#ccffcc"
| 80
| April 19, 1994
| @ New York
| W 87–84
|
|
|
| Madison Square Garden
| 56–24
|- align="center" bgcolor="#ffcccc"
| 81
| April 21, 1994
| @ Miami
| L 89–94
|
|
|
| Miami Arena
| 56–25
|- align="center" bgcolor="#ccffcc"
| 82
| April 23, 1994
| Orlando
| W 93–89
|
|
|
| The Omni
| 57–25

Playoffs
Entering the playoffs, the Hawks struggled, as they needed the full five games to get past the Miami Heat in the Eastern Conference quarterfinals. In the Eastern Conference semifinals, the Hawks were upset by the Indiana Pacers in 6 games.

|- align="center" bgcolor="#ffcccc"
| 1
| April 28, 1994
| Miami
| L 88–93
| Kevin Willis (17)
| Kevin Willis (16)
| Mookie Blaylock (9)
| The Omni11,543
| 0–1
|- align="center" bgcolor="#ccffcc"
| 2
| April 30, 1994
| Miami
| W 104–86
| Danny Manning (20)
| Kevin Willis (14)
| Mookie Blaylock (8)
| The Omni16,368
| 1–1
|- align="center" bgcolor="#ffcccc"
| 3
| May 3, 1994
| @ Miami
| L 86–90
| Craig Ehlo (20)
| Kevin Willis (13)
| Danny Manning (8)
| Miami Arena15,200
| 1–2
|- align="center" bgcolor="#ccffcc"
| 4
| May 5, 1994
| @ Miami
| W 103–89
| Mookie Blaylock (29)
| Kevin Willis (14)
| Mookie Blaylock (7)
| Miami Arena15,200
| 2–2
|- align="center" bgcolor="#ccffcc"
| 5
| May 8, 1994
| Miami
| W 102–91
| Kevin Willis (24)
| Kevin Willis (12)
| Mookie Blaylock (18)
| The Omni14,472
| 3–2
|-

|- align="center" bgcolor="#ffcccc"
| 1
| May 10, 1994
| Indiana
| L 85–96
| Danny Manning (21)
| Kevin Willis (10)
| Mookie Blaylock (8)
| The Omni13,190
| 0–1
|- align="center" bgcolor="#ccffcc"
| 2
| May 12, 1994
| Indiana
| W 92–69
| Manning, Willis (20)
| Kevin Willis (15)
| Mookie Blaylock (13)
| The Omni15,854
| 1–1
|- align="center" bgcolor="#ffcccc"
| 3
| May 14, 1994
| @ Indiana
| L 81–101
| Kevin Willis (14)
| Willis, Manning (10)
| Mookie Blaylock (7)
| Market Square Arena16,545
| 1–2
|- align="center" bgcolor="#ffcccc"
| 4
| May 15, 1994
| @ Indiana
| L 86–102
| Danny Manning (35)
| Andrew Lang (8)
| Blaylock, Ehlo (5)
| Market Square Arena16,561
| 1–3
|- align="center" bgcolor="#ccffcc"
| 5
| May 17, 1994
| Indiana
| W 88–76
| Craig Ehlo (22)
| Mookie Blaylock (10)
| Mookie Blaylock (13)
| The Omni14,849
| 2–3
|- align="center" bgcolor="#ffcccc"
| 6
| May 19, 1994
| @ Indiana
| L 79–98
| Mookie Blaylock (23)
| Danny Manning (10)
| three players tied (4)
| Market Square Arena16,552
| 2–4
|-

Player statistics

Legend

Season

Playoffs

Awards and records

Awards
Lenny Wilkens, NBA Coach of the Year
Mookie Blaylock, NBA All-Defensive First Team

Records

Transactions

Trades
February 24, 1994: Traded Dominique Wilkins and a 1994 first round draft pick to the Los Angeles Clippers for Danny Manning.
June 22, 1994: Traded Roy Hinson (unrostered) to the Milwaukee Bucks for Ken Norman.

Free Agents

Additions

Subtractions

Player Transactions Citation:

See also
1993-94 NBA season

References

Atlanta Hawks seasons
Atlanta Haw
Atlanta Haw
Atlanta Hawks